The Oti River or Pendjari River is an international river in West Africa. It rises in Benin, forms the border between Benin and Burkina Faso, flows through Togo, and joins the Volta River in Ghana.

Geography
Its headwaters are in Benin and Burkina Faso, it flows through Benin and Togo and joins the Volta River in Ghana. Tributaries on the left bank in Togo originate from the Togo Mountains to the south. One of its eastern tributaries is the Kara River, the confluence being on the Ghana–Togo border, where another tributary joins from the south, the Koumongou River. The mouth of the Oti was formerly on the Volta River, but it now flows into Lake Volta reservoir in Ghana.

Along the margins of the river is gallery forest which floods periodically. The dry season here lasts from about November until April, with the hot dry Harmattan wind blowing from the north. At this time of the year the river's flow is minimal. These flood extensively during the wet season, but during the dry season they become dry, dusty plains, with the occasional pond or lake in a depression. Cattle graze on the floodplains during the dry season. There is also some small scale growing of crops, and the hunting of game takes place there.

International borders
The river forms part of the international borders between Ghana, Burkina Faso, Togo, and Benin.

Parks
The Oti River flows through Pendjari National Park in Benin and the Oti-Kéran National Park in Togo.

References

International rivers of Africa
Volta River
Rivers of Benin
Rivers of Burkina Faso
Rivers of Ghana
Rivers of Togo
Lake Volta
Benin–Burkina Faso border
Benin–Togo border
Burkina Faso–Ghana border
Burkina Faso–Togo border
Ghana–Togo border
Ramsar sites in Benin
Border rivers